Yarpur may refer to:

Yarpur, Nalanda, a village in Nalanda district, Bihar, India
Yarpur, Sitapur, a village in Sitapur district, Uttar Pradesh, India
Yarpur, Ambedkar Nagar, a village in Ambedkar Nagar district, Uttar Pradesh, India